Gepps Cross Football Club is an Australian rules football club located at Duncan Fraser Reserve, Northfield, South Australia. The club colours are red, white and blue.

The club was first formed in 1952, playing in the North Adelaide District Football Association.

The club plays in Division 4 of the Adelaide Footy League and is known as "The Rams". The Club has produced several high-profile Australian Football League (AFL) and South Australian National Football League (SANFL) players.

Club song

Ziga Zaga Ziga Zaga Oi Oi Oi,
Ziga Zaga Ziga Zaga Oi Oi Oi,
Ziga Oi,
Zaga Oi,
Ziga Zaga Ziga Zaga Oi Oi Oi,

Oh we're a jolly bunch of fellas,
each and everyone's a star,
And if we're not at football,
you'll find us at the bar,
and if you'll care to join us,
you'll find that we're all right,
and then you'll be a member of the blue, red and white!

Should auld acquaintance be forgot,
keep your eyes on the red, white and blue!

References

External links 
 Gepps Cross FC
 Footypedia
 South Australian Amateur Football League

Australian rules football clubs in South Australia
Adelaide Footy League clubs
1952 establishments in Australia
Australian rules football clubs established in 1952